Kheskok (also Romanized as Khoskak; also known as Khesok and Khosok) is a village in Sakhvid Rural District, Nir District, Taft County, Yazd Province, Iran. At the 2006 census, its population was 123, in 31 families.

References 

Populated places in Taft County